DART Light Rail is the light rail system serving the metropolitan area of Dallas, Texas and is owned and operated by Dallas Area Rapid Transit (DART).

That makes it  the 5th highest ridership of light rail systems in the United States; however, it was one of the worst financial performers.

The system uses the Kinki Sharyo SLRV ("Super Light Rail Vehicle") and the fleet of 163 vehicles was modified in the 2000s to add level boarding and higher passenger capacity.

, the following lines are active:
  (opened in 1996, completed in its current state in 2002)
  (opened in 1996, completed in its current state in 2016)
  (opened in 2009, completed in its current state in 2010)
  (opened in 2010, completed in its current state in 2021)

History

Planning 

The election plan was pared down to  when Duncanville, Grand Prairie and Mesquite, which would have had rail lines, opted out of joining the agency. DART chose light rail transit as its primary mode of rail transportation. The plan was pared down again to  after a bond vote.

Starter system 
After years of scandals involving finances, delays in construction of the rail system, a failed bond election, and nine pull-out votes (two of which were successful), October 1990 was a turning point for the agency, when DART first broke ground on its light rail system. The first sections of track were laid in July 1993.  In June 1996, the light rail system began service on time and on budget inaugurating the first light rail system in Texas. Commuter rail service to Irving began in December, after some delays.

To the surprise of critics, the new light rail system was embraced by Dallasites, with ridership exceeding expectations.  The suburbs' confidence in DART was also expressed at the ballot box: four cities held highly publicized pullout elections in 1996 (with the financial assistance of Dallas Cowboys owner Jerry Jones who wanted DART's half-cent sales tax revenue for Texas Stadium in Irving, the Cowboys' home at the time), but all four voted to remain in DART (three of them by margins of more than two-to-one).

It includes the tunnel from Pearl Street to Mockingbird Lane, the latter being the site of Dallas's first modern transit village. The northern terminus of the  remained Pearl Station at that time.

This came on May 31, 1997, nearly one year after the first part of the starter system opened.

The final change to the starter system came on December 18, 2000, when DART opened Cityplace Station (now called Cityplace/Uptown Station), the system's first subway station, in the tunnel between Pearl and Mockingbird Lane under the Tower at Cityplace skyscraper, providing access to the Tower as well as Cityplace West. It was the system's first in-fill stop.

Commuter rail on the old Rock Island right-of-way began during the series of openings of the light rail starter system. On December 30, 1996, the  opened the first segment as the South Irving Transit Center was connected to Union Station in downtown Dallas with a stop in the middle at Medical/Market Center Station. The agency had to lease rail cars due to a delay in the current stock until that March.

Suburban expansion 

After the success of the light rail starter system, voters approved DART's request to use long-term bonds to expedite the construction of the regional light rail system.  While DART had originally planned single-track extensions of the Blue Line to Garland and the Red Line to Richardson and Plano, the starter system was so popular that the agency made plans to double-track the entire route.

Later that same year, on September 27, the Blue Line designation was extended to Mockingbird Lane, for its eventual expansion to Garland. Later, the Blue Line was further extended east outside the LBJ Loop when the LBJ/Skillman Station opened on May 6, 2002.

The first extension of the Red Line opened on July 1, 2002, when the line was extended 7 stations north from a newly rebuilt Park Lane Station to Galatyn Parkway.  Richardson became the first Dallas suburb to be served by light rail.

The Blue Line was completed to Garland on November 18, 2002, making it the second suburb to get light rail service. The two new stations of Forest/Jupiter Station and Downtown Garland Station were opened to the public.

The final stage of north-central and northeast "suburban" light rail expansion opened six months ahead of schedule when the Red Line extension to Downtown Plano and Parker Road opened on December 9, 2002, providing light rail service to Plano for the first time, and completing the current configuration of the Red Line.

2030 Plan 
In October 2006, the DART Board of Directors unanimously approved a long-term "2030 Plan", which included the following proposals for its next round of rail expansion:
A  light rail extension of the  along Scyene Road to approximately Masters Drive. The line would branch off the Green Line east of Lawnview Avenue.
A  light rail line in West Dallas along Fort Worth Avenue or Singleton to Loop 12/Jefferson Boulevard.  No color designation was given for this planned line.
This area previously opposed rail service, so the tracks were built through the area without a station. Lake Highlands opened on December 6, 2010, becoming the first component of the 2030 plan to be completed and the first infill station in DART's system. This is a key component of the new Lake Highlands Town Center TOD development.
A nearly  Silver Line commuter service in the east-west Cotton Belt corridor from the Red Line in Plano to DFW International Airport.

The final 2030 plan included several changes from the draft plan released in July 2006. DART officials cited the line's high cost, US$700 million, and lack of strong support from the city of Dallas. The  extension to the Dallas Southport Center (intermodal terminal) was added after strong pressure from Dallas officials. Also, the proposed light rail line serving West Dallas was not originally considered as a priority for rail service.

The Cotton Belt corridor plans continued to generate controversy right up to the day of the vote on the 2030 plan. However, the line would pass through affluent Far North Dallas neighborhoods, which formed the Cotton Belt Concerned Coalition to fight the line in 1990. The group lobbied for electric light rail vehicles on the line to avoid perceived air and noise pollution associated with diesel rail, and also proposed that the line be placed in a below-ground trench. These proposals were accepted by the City of Dallas in June 2006 in a unanimous resolution. DART, however, balked at the cost of trenching the line, which they estimated at $250 million. This set up a confrontation between DART and the city of Dallas, which appoints eight of the board's 15 members. The final plan compromised by promising $50 million "to help address neighborhood concerns".

The Cotton Belt line would run through former DART member city Coppell between Carrollton and DFW Airport; although no station locations are included in the plan, the promise of a future station could entice Coppell, which withdrew from DART in 1989, into rejoining the agency.

In 2010, citing deficits and drops in revenue, DART scrapped much of their 2030 plan.

Green and Orange Line expansion 
On July 3, 2006, the Federal Transit Administration (FTA) approved a US$700 million Full Funding Grant Agreement (FFGA) — the largest grant ever awarded to DART — to kick-start a US$2.5 billion expansion of the light rail system. This phase included two new light rail lines that doubled DART's light rail mileage. Construction began in September 2006.

In maps before 2006, DART labeled the Pleasant Grove to Carrollton route the "Orange Line", and the Irving route was the "Purple Line". By the time construction started, DART was using the new Green Line designation as part of its marketing efforts, saying "Like the color green, this line is a symbol of our city on the move."

The  began operation on September 14, 2009, with a route from downtown Dallas southeast to Fair Park; this short route was scheduled to open in time to service the 2009 State Fair of Texas. On December 6, 2010, the line extended further at both ends – to Pleasant Grove, as well as continuing northwest from Victory Station to Farmers Branch and Carrollton; both extensions, completing the Green Line.

The Green Line's northern end connects with the A-train line run by the Denton County Transportation Authority (DCTA). This line connects Denton to Carrollton, with stops in Lewisville and Highland Village. The commuter train may stop in other Denton County cities, should they choose to join the DCTA.

The second line, the  originates at LBJ/Central on the Red Line and runs concurrently with the Red Line to downtown, then with the Green Line to northwest of Love Field Airport at Bachman Lake, where it branches off toward Irving, then continuing to DFW International Airport. DART is cooperating with Love Field to link that airport to the Orange Line, but service is currently connected by a bus shuttle. The line runs through Las Colinas and connects to the Las Colinas APT System. The line ends at LBJ/Central Station with rush hour service to Parker Road Station. The first Orange Line stations opened on July 30, 2012, while service to Belt Line Station in Irving began on December 3, 2012. An extension of the Orange Line from Belt Line Station to DFW Airport Station opened on August 18, 2014.

Downtown Dallas (D2) Transit Study 

In 2007, DART recognized that with Blue and Red Line trains sharing tracks through the Dallas Central Business District corridor, and the Orange and Green Lines also using this trunk segment through downtown, a single alignment would not have the capacity to support all four rail lines. Under a 1990 agreement with the City of Dallas, DART agreed to build a second rail alignment through downtown once certain operating or ridership figures were met, and DART projected that it would hit these targets by the early 2010s. As a result, DART commissioned its Downtown Dallas Transit Study, known as the D2 Study, to study the possibility of building a second rail alignment through downtown.

In spring 2008, DART announced it had considered 16 possible plans for a second rail alignment, and selected four for more detailed consideration. All four proposals provided for an alignment between Victory Station and Deep Ellum Station, indicating the D2 alignment would be used for Green and Orange Line service while the Red and Blue Lines would continue to use the existing alignment.  However, on April 27, 2010, DART announced financial problems would prevent it from funding construction of the D2 alignment, putting the plan in limbo.

After a three-year hiatus, DART announced on February 6, 2013 that it would begin holding public hearings on "Phase II" of the D2 study, to discuss alternatives and refinements to its D2 options since it ended "Phase I" of the D2 study in 2010.  At a public hearing on February 13, 2013, DART announced it was expanding to consider eight possible D2 alignments, some of which would connect to Union Station instead of Victory Station and thus provide Red and Blue Line service.  While the D2 Study is being funded by a $700,000 grant, the $500 million to $1 billion alignment is unfunded, and construction is not expected to begin before 2025.

In August 2015, the Dallas City Council voted to only recommend an alignment above-ground along Jackson Street, over the objections of DART officials, who requested the addition of a Young Street route as a fallback. The alignment along Young Street was opposed by the First Presbyterian Church of Dallas, as the light rail would run through its property. However, the church and local residents, along with structural issues (the local library would have to be demolished, and many historic buildings would be close to or within the path of the line), helped to form an opposition to the new Jackson locally preferred alternative (LPA). Due to this, the City of Dallas voted against the Jackson alignment and instead for the alignment to be in a subway for the majority of its time in downtown. This led DART to have to reconsider the alignment, and also balance funding for the Silver Line, which created tension between supporters of both rail lines, who believed that only one of the two could be built. However, DART eventually voted in favor of eventually funding the Cotton Belt and D2.

DART is considering three alignments, all of which are underground for a majority of their routes. A decision will be made by 2018 as to which route will be pitched to the FTA, although city leaders have endorsed the Commerce subway route (along with a downtown streetcar design) to move forward into consideration.

As of January 24th, 2023, D2 has been delayed by ten years. It will likely require re-evaluation once DART returns to the project. DART plans to use funds to improve the existing system, such as improved bus frequency, new vinyl seats in it's trains, hiring more police and new light rail vehicles.

Platform extensions 

To allow for more capacity the "platform extensions" will be completed before tunneling on the D2 corridor starts. This project allows for three-car trains during rush hour. There are 28 stations on the red and blue line that will be rebuilt at an estimated cost of $129 million. The planning for the platform extensions started in 2014 and the construction was approved in 2017. Regular operation of three-car trains is expected for 2022. In March 2018 the contract was awarded to Lockwood, Andrews & Newnam (LAN). Construction started in July 2019 to be finished in August 2022.

Apart from capacity the project allows for barrier-free access to trains even on the oldest lines of the network. The platforms will be raised to the  floor height of the low-floor middle section of the SLRV trains. This concept allows to get half of the funding from the Teax Mobility Funds. Almost another half of the funding comes from federal resources leaving mostly the planning costs to DART, which is below ten million.

The project has accordingly two phases. In the second phase the platforms are extended from their original  to accommodate long trains. At each end crossings and ramps are built.

The Orange and Green Lines had been constructed to that standard from the beginning. However they could not use that length in regular operation. The platform extensions were part of the initial planning of system with reserved space on each station since the 1980s. However, this concept was expecting a possibility of four-car trains with the LRV type vehicles of the time. The newer SRLV have that length with three-car trains already.

Current lines

Red Line 

The  runs from southwest to northeast, from Westmoreland Station, in southwest Dallas, to Parker Road Station in Plano.  Heading north from Westmoreland, the line provides service to Dallas Convention Center, Union Station, and the Dallas Central Business District, then follows Central Expressway (US 75) through north Dallas, Richardson and Plano.

Blue Line 

The  runs from southwest to northeast, UNT Dallas, in southwest Dallas, to Downtown Rowlett Station in Rowlett.  Heading north from UNT Dallas, the line provides service to Dallas Convention Center, Union Station, and the Dallas Central Business District, then turns northeast, providing service to White Rock Lake, Garland, and Rowlett.

Green Line 

The  runs from Buckner Station, near Loop 12 in southeast Dallas, to North Carrollton/Frankford Station in Carrollton in the northwest.  Heading north from Buckner, the line serves Fair Park, Deep Ellum, and the Dallas Central Business District, then turns northwest along the Interstate 35E (Texas) corridor, serving the American Airlines Center, Parkland Hospital, Love Field, Farmers Branch, and Carrollton, where a transfer is available to the A-train line run by the Denton County Transportation Authority (DCTA).

Orange Line 

The  runs between Parker Road Station in Plano and Dallas/Fort Worth International Airport.  The Orange Line duplicates the Red Line along the Central Expressway (US 75) corridor from Parker Road to the Dallas Central Business District, then follows the Green Line along the Interstate 35E (Texas) corridor, serving the American Airlines Center, Parkland Hospital, and Love Field, before branching west along the Highway 114 corridor to Irving.  The final leg of the Orange Line from Belt Line to DFW Airport opened on August 18, 2014.

Operation 
The DART light rail system operates seven days a week from 4:30 a.m. to 12:30 a.m.  On each individual line, service operates Monday through Friday every 15 minutes during commute periods and every 20 minutes middays and early evening, while operating every 30 minutes after approximately 10 p.m.  On Saturday and Sunday, service operates every 20 minutes between 9 a.m. and 8 p.m., and every 30 minutes early morning and at night.  Portions of the system have headways cut in half where at least two lines share rail tracks, with all four lines which converge in downtown Dallas along the Pacific Avenue/Bryan Street corridor commanding headways of 3.5 minutes at the most to 5–7 minutes at the least.

Accidents and incidents 

 On March 1, 2014 one person died after a train and a car collided.
 On May 15, 2014, six people and one crew member were injured after a train collided with a flatbed truck in Farmer's Branch.
 On June 30, 2014 a man died after an accident at Bachman Station.
 On December 19, 2020 two people were injured after a derailment in Downtown Dallas.
 On October 16, 2021 a person died after being hit by a train near the Farmers Branch station.

See also 
 List of DART Light Rail stations
 Dallas Streetcar
 McKinney Avenue Transit Authority
 Light rail in the United States
 List of United States light rail systems by ridership
 List of tram and light rail transit systems

References

External links 

Official site
Official site (Spanish Language)
System Map
Expansion Plan Map
DART History

Light Rail
Railway lines opened in 1996
Rail transportation in Dallas
Transportation in Dallas County, Texas
Dallas–Fort Worth metroplex
Passenger rail transportation in Texas
Light rail in Texas
Electric railways in Texas
Standard gauge railways in the United States
750 V DC railway electrification
1996 establishments in Texas